Bonames is a quarter of Frankfurt am Main, Germany. It is part of the Ortsbezirk Nord-Ost.

The name comes from the Latin phrase "bona mansio" (literally: good harborage) which has its roots in the time of the Roman rule.

References

Districts of Frankfurt